A list of the earliest films produced in the Cinema of Nepal, ordered by year of release from 2001. For an alphabetical list of articles on Nepalese films, see :Category:Nepalese films.

2001
Nepalese
Films